Tanner House (born April 27, 1986) is a Canadian former professional ice hockey player. He played in three seasons in the American Hockey League (AHL), all with the Oklahoma City Barons.

Playing career
After playing junior hockey with the Canmore Eagles and Penticton Vees, followed by four seasons with the Maine Black Bears, House was signed to a two-year contract by the Edmonton Oilers on March 19, 2011. He had been the team's captain in his final two seasons with Maine, and had won the Hockey East Best Defensive Forward award, as well as the Dean Smith Award as the top male student-athlete at the University of Maine.

After signing the contract, he joined the Oilers' AHL affiliate, the Oklahoma City Barons, on an Amateur Tryout (ATO) for the six remaining games of their season. He tallied one goal and four assists in those games.

Not making the Oilers' roster out of training camp, the 2011-12 season would be his first full season with the Barons. He would play in 68 games for the team and continued his reputation as a defensive forward, putting up 20 points and often being relied on to kill penalties and shut down opposing players. He would remain with Oklahoma City in the 2012-13 season, this time only appearing in 55 of the team's 76 games. He was not re-signed by the Oilers organization after that season, his last in professional hockey.

Career statistics

References

External links

1986 births
Canadian ice hockey centres
Canmore Eagles players
Living people
Maine Black Bears men's ice hockey players
Oklahoma City Barons players
Penticton Vees players